The National Home Guard Combat School (HvSS) is a school of the Swedish Home Guard which trains Home Guard commanders in combat and leadership. Its based in Vällinge in Salem Municipality.

History
The National Home Guard Combat School was inaugurated on 27 June 1943. In the autumn of 1941, the Home Guard began searching for a central place for training and the then Home Guard chief Gustaf Petri visited, among other places, the manor Vällinge. The site was found suitable and received permission from, among others, Stockholms vattenledningsverk ("Stockholm's waterworks") to use the buildings and the surrounding land for a symbolic sum of SEK 200 per year. In March 1942, a call was sent out to companies and certain individuals for grants for the renovation of the school, among other things signed by Crown Prince Gustaf Adolf, and soon SEK 445,000 had been collected. Of this sum, two student rooms and a shooting range were built.

Heraldry and traditions

Coats of arms
Blazon: "Azure, the badge of the Home guard, the letter H under three open crowns, placed two and one inside an open chaplet of laurel, all or. The shield surmounted two swords in saltire of the last colour."

Colours, standards and guidons
The colour was presented to the school in Vällinge by His Majesty the King Carl XVI Gustaf at the 50-years school anniversary on 27 May 1993. The colour is drawn by Ingrid Lamby and embroidered by machine in insertion technique by Gunilla Hjort. Blazon: "On blue cloth in the centre the badge of the Home Guard; the letter H under three open crowns placed two and one inside an open chaplet of laurels. In the second and fourth corners the year 1943 divided with two figures in each corner, all yellow."

Commanding officers

1943-07-01--1945: Capt Roland Tillman, I 4
1949-06-01--1953-03-31: Capt Erik Gunnar Burman, I 19
1953-04-01--1957-06-30: Capt Sten Lindqvist, I 15
1957-07-01--1963-07-31: Maj Sten-Eggert Nauclér, I 4
1963-08-01--1974-09-30: LtCol Orvar Nilsson, I 14
1974-10-01--1981-03-31: LtCol Per Richard, I 15
1981-04-01--1986-03-31: LtCol Bo Eriksson, I 21
1986-04-01--1990-09-30: LtCol Stig Dackevall, I 1
1990-10-01--1992-04-01: Col Kjell Forsmark, A 9
1992-04-01--1992-05-15: LtCol Caj Gavestam, I 3
1992-05-15--1994-03-27: LtCol Sammy Enkullen, I 1
1994-03-28--1994-09-30: LtCol Caj Gavestam, I 3
1994-10-01--1999-04-30: Col Henrik von Vegesack, I 1
1999-05-01--2001-07-01: LtCol Jonny Nilsson, I 14/LG
2001-07-01--2004-12-31: LtCol Lars Enlund, Ing 1
2005-01-01--2007-02-16 (04-01): LtCol Anders Gustafsson, HKV
2007-02-19--2007-03-31: LtCol Bengt Gustavsson, HKV
2007-04-01--2010-06-30: LtCol Torsten Hallstedt, HKV
2010-07-01--2017-12-31: Col Björn Olsson, HKV
2018-01-01--2018-02-28: LtCol Claes Alsteryd, HvSS (acting)
2018-03-01--2021-07-31: Col Jonas Karlsson
2021-08-01--2021-12-31: LtCol Per Magnus Nilsson
2022-01-01: LtCol Håkan Sigurdsson (acting)
2022-03-31--2026-03-31: Col  Johan Brovertz, HvSS

Footnotes

References

Notes

Print

External links

Military education and training in Sweden
Military units and formations established in 1943
Educational institutions established in 1943
1943 establishments in Sweden
Salem Municipality